Institute of Informatics and Communication (IIC) is a constituent institute of the University of Delhi, in New Delhi, India. The institute offers degree in  Masters of Science (Informatics). The institute was established in 1997 and has an intake of 62 students. The institute provides studies in the field of informatics, which is essentially a blend of three domains: networking, telecommunication and software, on three major platforms:  Windows, Linux and Macintosh.

Notable alumni 

 Prashant Pillai, Professor of Cyber Security and Associate Dean for Research and Knowledge Enterprise at University of Wolverhampton

Events at IIC
Techspur is an annual one-day technical seminar at IIC organised primarily aiming at strengthening the industry-academic relationship. It comprises talks by eminent personalities from the field of communication and information technology.
REMINISCENCE:The alumini meet of IIC.
Envisage is a national level technical festival organised annually to promote open source technical excellence. The event provides platform for students to participate from across the country. The principal aim of the fest is to facilitate the growth and exchange of knowledge and imagination among the participants of diverse educational backgrounds hailing from all over India.

References

Delhi University
1997 establishments in Delhi
Schools of informatics